Fernando Corrêa de Oliveira (Porto, November 2, 1921 – October 21, 2004) was a Portuguese composer.  Among his works are numerous pieces for orchestra, as well as a deal of chamber music; he also composed some vocal pieces and two operas, one of which, O Cábula, was the first Portuguese opera for children.

References
Biography

Portuguese composers
Portuguese male composers
Musicians from Porto
1921 births
2004 deaths
20th-century male musicians